Iron(II) gluconate, or ferrous gluconate, is a black compound often used as an iron supplement. It is the iron(II) salt of gluconic acid. It is marketed under brand names such as Fergon, Ferralet and Simron.

Uses

Medical

Ferrous gluconate is effectively used in the treatment of hypochromic anemia. The use of this compound compared with other iron preparations results in satisfactory reticulocyte responses, a high percentage utilization of iron, and daily increase in hemoglobin that a normal level occurs in a reasonably short time.

Food additive
Ferrous gluconate is also used as a food additive when processing black olives. It is represented by the food labeling E number E579 in Europe. It imparts a uniform jet black color to the olives.

Toxicity
Ferrous gluconate may be toxic in case of overdose. Children may show signs of toxicity with ingestions of 10–20 mg/kg of elemental iron. Serious toxicity may result from ingestions of more than 60 mg/kg. Iron exerts both local and systemic effects: it is corrosive to the gastrointestinal mucosa, it can have a negative impact on the heart and blood (dehydration, low blood pressure, fast and weak pulse, shock), lungs, liver, gastrointestinal system (diarrhea, nausea, vomiting blood), nervous system (chills, dizziness, coma, convulsions, headache), and skin (flushing, loss of color, bluish-colored lips and fingernails). The symptoms may disappear in a few hours, but then emerge again after 1 or more days.

See also

Acceptable daily intake
Iron poisoning

References

Color fixers
Food additives
Iron(II) compounds
E-number additives